North Carolina Highway 94 (NC 94) is a primary state highway in the U.S. state of North Carolina. It runs from Hyde County in Swan Quarter to Chowan County near Edenton.

Route description

The route spans the Albemarle Sound at the  Albemarle Sound Bridge, connecting Chowan and Washington Counties. It also crosses Lake Mattamuskeet at the Mattamuskeet National Wildlife Refuge. The highway passes through the following municipalities:

Swan Quarter, North Carolina
Fairfield, North Carolina
Columbia, North Carolina
Creswell, North Carolina

History
NC 94 was established in 1930 as a new primary spur routing from NC 91, in Swindell Fork to Fairfield. In 1931, NC 94 was extended north on new primary routing to NC 90, in Columbia. In 1935, NC 94's southern terminus was rerouted to US 264, in Rose Bay; the reroute was a swap with NC 6. In 1942, NC 94 was rerouted at Fairfield onto new primary routing directly south through Lake Mattamuskeet. The nearly  causeway connects directly with US 264 near New Holland; the former alignment that went around the western banks of Lake Mattamuskeet were downgraded to secondary roads (Piney Woods Road (SR 1305) and Turnpike Road (SR 1304)).

In 2000, NC 94 was extended both directions: At Lake Comfort, it goes west on a  concurrency with US 264 to Swan Quarter, where it then splits off onto Main Street and continues till it reaches NC 45, its current southern terminus. At Columbia, NC 94 goes west on a  concurrency with US 64 near Pea Ridge, where it then switches concurrences with NC 32. Traveling north, it crosses over the Albemarle Sound, then separates from NC 32 near St. Johns. On Soundside Road, it connects with Northeastern Regional Airport before reconnecting with NC 32 near Edenton and its current northern terminus. In 2003, US 64 was rerouted onto new primary routing through Washington County and part of Tyrrell County, leaving NC 94 continuing along its former alignment.

Major intersections

References

External links

 NCRoads.com: N.C. 94

094
Transportation in Hyde County, North Carolina
Transportation in Tyrrell County, North Carolina
Transportation in Washington County, North Carolina
Transportation in Chowan County, North Carolina